Fifty Shades Freed is a 2018 American erotic romantic drama film directed by James Foley and written by Niall Leonard, and based on E. L. James's 2012 novel of the same name. It is the third and final installment in the Fifty Shades film series, following Fifty Shades of Grey (2015) and Fifty Shades Darker (2017). The film stars Dakota Johnson and Jamie Dornan as Anastasia Steele and Christian Grey, respectively, and follows the couple as they marry, and must deal with Ana's former boss (Eric Johnson), who begins to stalk them.

Following the first film premiered in February 2015, development on the sequels promptly began. By November 2015, Foley was hired to direct both sequels, which would be shot back-to-back in 2016.Principal photography on Fifty Shades Freed began simultaneously with Darker in February 2016, in Paris and Vancouver, and ended in July 2016.

Fifty Shades Freed was released in the United States on February 9, 2018, including a limited IMAX release. It was a box office success, grossing over $370 million worldwide against a production budget of $55 million, but the lowest-grossing film of the trilogy. Like its two predecessors, Fifty Shades Freed received negative reviews, with criticism for its screenplay and acting.

Plot
Newlyweds Christian and Anastasia are forced to cut their honeymoon short and return home after receiving news of a break-in at his corporate headquarters. Some computer files were stolen and security camera tapes identify the perpetrator as Jack Hyde, Ana's former boss who was fired for sexual assault. Meanwhile, Ana is introduced to her new personal security team.

Christian surprises Ana with a new house and has hired an attractive architect, Gia Matteo, to rebuild it for her. She is annoyed when Gia openly flirts with him in her presence. Ana privately threatens to fire Gia if she keeps it up, forcing her to stop.

When Christian is away on a business trip, Ana disregards his wishes that she stay at home, and meets her friend, Kate Kavanagh, for a drink. Kate is dating Christian's older brother Elliot and fears Elliot may be having an affair with Gia, his business associate. Jack Hyde attempts to kidnap Ana when she gets home. Ana's security team subdues him and he is arrested.

After arguing with Christian about her night out with Kate, Ana berates him for being overly controlling and possessive and demands more freedom. Soon after, he surprises her with a trip to Aspen, bringing along Kate, Elliot, Mia, and José. Elliot proposes to Kate, who accepts. It is revealed that Gia was only helping Elliot choose the ring.

The newlyweds continue with their erotic sexual experimentation, but it becomes complicated when Ana announces she is pregnant. Christian is deeply disturbed, saying he had other plans for their early years together. He leaves, going on a night-long drunken bender. After he returns, Ana discovers that Christian had texted and met his ex-lover and former BDSM dominant, Elena Lincoln. She becomes angry with him and locks herself in the playroom for the night. He searches for Ana in the morning and they continue arguing, with Ana telling Christian how important the baby is to her.

Shortly after, Hyde is released on a $500,000 bond and phones demanding a ransom for Mia, Christian's abducted sister. Hyde demands $5 million in cash in two hours and threatens to kill her if his demands are not met. He warns Ana to tell no one and to bring the money alone. Ana takes a chequebook and revolver from Christian's desk and goes to the bank to withdraw the full amount.

The suspicious bank manager calls Christian. He thinks Ana is leaving him but then notices it coincides with Hyde's recent release, Mia's unknown whereabouts, and Ana's sudden large cash withdrawal. Hyde instructs Ana to get into a car parked in the alley and to hand over her phone to the driver to discard. She tricks Hyde by taking the bank manager's phone and slipping hers into the bag of money. She exits the back entrance to discover that the driver and Jack's accomplice is her co-worker, Liz.

Ana arrives at the drop-off site with the money. Hyde, psychotic and vengeful, attacks her, kicking her abdomen. Liz tries to stop him as Ana pulls out the revolver and shoots him in the leg. Christian and his security team, who electronically tracked Ana's cell phone, arrive and apprehend Hyde and Liz. Ana blacks out as she hears Christian's voice.

Ana awakens three days later in the hospital with Christian at her side. Though angry at her recklessness and still anxious about fatherhood, he realizes how important their baby is to her, and they reconcile. Christian's adoptive mother, Grace, assures him that Ana will not leave him. She returns home the next day.

Christian's private investigator, Welch, has left a report showing that Christian and Hyde had shared the same foster family, though he has no memory of this. Hyde was envious of Christian being adopted by the wealthy Grey family instead of him. Hyde also blackmailed Liz into being his accomplice. Christian and Ana also find out where his birth mother is buried. They visit her grave and he lays flowers on it.

While Christian is playing his piano, Ana walks through the hallway to the living room to watch Christian. As she's watching him, flashbacks of Christian and Ana's time together are shown with "Love Me like You Do" playing. Ana then decides she wants to play. She sends him a text message to get his attention. As Christian joins Ana in the playroom, the music continues to play as Christian shuts the door, right after seeing Ana smile.

Seven months later, Christian and Ana have a son named Teddy and three years later Ana is pregnant with their second child.

Cast
 Dakota Johnson as Anastasia "Ana" Grey, Christian's wife and Teddy's mother.
 Jamie Dornan as Christian Grey, Ana's husband and Teddy's father
 Eric Johnson as Jack Hyde, Ana's former boss and stalker.
 Eloise Mumford as Katherine Kavanagh, Ana's best friend and Elliot Grey's fiancée.
 Rita Ora as Mia Grey, the adoptive daughter of Carrick Grey and Dr. Grace Trevelyan Grey, and younger sister of Christian and Elliot Grey.
 Luke Grimes as Elliot Grey, older brother of Christian and Mia Grey, and Katherine's fiancé.
 Victor Rasuk as José Rodriguez, one of Anastasia's friends.
 Max Martini as Jason Taylor, Christian's bodyguard.
 Jennifer Ehle as Carla May Wilks, Anastasia's mother.
 Kim Basinger as Elena Lincoln, Christian's former dominant. (Unrated Version only) 
 Marcia Gay Harden as Grace Trevelyan Grey, Christian's adoptive mother.
 Bruce Altman as Jerry Roach.
 Arielle Kebbel as Gia Matteo, the architect recommended by Elliot Grey to design Anastasia and Christian's future home.
 Callum Keith Rennie as Ray, Anastasia's former stepfather.
 Robinne Lee as Ros Bailey, Christian's second in command.
 Brant Daugherty as Luke Sawyer, Ana's bodyguard.
 Amy Price-Francis as Liz Morgan, Jack's accomplice.
 Tyler Hoechlin as Boyce Fox, a popular author whose books are published by SIP.
 Ashleigh LaThrop as Hannah, Ana's co-worker and friend.
 Fay Masterson as Gail Jones, Christian's housekeeper.
 Hiro Kanagawa as Detective Clark.

Production
Universal Pictures and Focus Features secured the rights to the trilogy in March 2012. The films were produced by Michael De Luca Productions. At a fan screening of the first film in New York City on February 6, 2015, director Sam Taylor-Johnson confirmed that the book sequels Fifty Shades Darker and Fifty Shades Freed would also be adapted, with the first sequel then set to be released in 2016. After the announcement, Taylor-Johnson told Digital Spy that "It's not my decision [to return], and I haven't been privy to any of the discussions." On November 12, 2015, TheWrap reported that James Foley would direct both sequels, which would be shot back-to-back in 2016, with Niall Leonard writing the script and Michael De Luca and Dana Brunetti returning to produce, along with E. L. James and Marcus Viscidi. Dakota Johnson and Jamie Dornan were also set to return in the lead roles. On February 8, 2016, Arielle Kebbel was cast in the film to play Gia Matteo, a beautiful architect who is hired by Christian to build his home, and on February 12, 2016, Eric Johnson was cast as Jack Hyde, Ana's boss at SIP and stalker. On February 20, 2016, Brant Daugherty signed on to play Sawyer, the personal bodyguard for Anastasia.

Filming
In November 2015, Universal Studios announced that Fifty Shades Darker and Fifty Shades Freed would be shot back-to-back, with principal photography scheduled to commence in early 2016. Filming took place in Paris and Vancouver from February 9, 2016, to July 12, 2016, under the working title "Further Adventures of Max and Banks 2 & 3".

Music

The lead single from the film's soundtrack, "For You", performed by Rita Ora and Liam Payne, was released on January 5, 2018. The soundtrack's track list was released on January 8, 2018, including artists Julia Michaels, Sia, Jessie J, Black Atlass, Ellie Goulding, Hailee Steinfeld, Dua Lipa, and Miike Snow on the 22-song album.

Release

Fifty Shades Freed was released to theatres on February 9, 2018. The film released had a digital on April 24, 2018, with a Blu-ray Disc, DVD and 4K Ultra HD Blu-ray release following on May 8, 2018.

Reception

Box office
Fifty Shades Freed grossed $100.4 million in the United States and Canada, and $270.2 million in other territories, for a worldwide total of $371.2 million, against a production budget of $55 million.

In the United States and Canada, Fifty Shades Freed was released alongside Peter Rabbit and The 15:17 to Paris, and was projected to gross $37–40 million from 3,768 theaters in its opening weekend. It made $5.6 million from Thursday night previews, down 2% from the $5.7 million taken in by Fifty Shades Darker the previous year. It ended up making $38.6 million over the weekend, the lowest of the trilogy, but enough to take first place at the box office. The film grossed $10.8 million on Valentine's Day, the third-highest total for when the holiday fell on a weekday, behind The Vow ($11.6 million in 2012) and Darker ($11 million), and bringing its five-day gross to $56.1 million.<ref>{{cite web |url=https://deadline.com/2018/02/black-panther-fifty-shades-freed-valentines-day-box-office-1202288879/|title=Fifty Shades Freed' Pops At Valentine's Day B.O. Before 'Black Panther' Attacks – Update|first=Anthony|last=D'Alessandro|work=Deadline Hollywood|publisher=Penske Business Media|date=February 15, 2018|access-date=February 15, 2018}}</ref> In its second weekend the film only made $17.3 million, a 55.1% drop.

Worldwide, the film was expected to make $80–90 million from 57 countries, including France, Germany, the UK, Australia, Brazil, Mexico and Japan, for a worldwide debut of $113–130 million in its first three days. It ended up grossing $98.1 million from overseas for a global debut of $136.9 million.

Critical response
The film garnered overwhelming negative reviews by critics and audiences alike. The website's critical consensus reads, "Fifty Shades Freed brings its titillating trilogy to a clumsy conclusion, making for a film franchise that adds up to a distinctly dissatisfying ménage à trois." On Metacritic, the film has a weighted average score of 31 out of 100, based on 43 critics, meaning "generally unfavorable reviews." Audiences polled by CinemaScore gave the film an average grade of "B+" on an A+ to F scale, the same score earned by Darker, while PostTrak reported that 56% of women (who made up 81% of the opening weekend audience) gave the film a "definite recommend".

Writing for Variety, Guy Lodge was critical of the film, saying "Indeed, a sex-free, PG-13 version of Freed could be cut without shedding a second of narrative coherence, such as it is; one could ask what the point of that would be, though similar queries might be leveled at the film as it stands." Rolling Stones Peter Travers gave the film zero out of four, stating "With this last entry, we have officially hit the bottom of the barrel. Whips, chains, butt plugs and nipple clips are nothing compared to the sheer torture of watching this movie." Robbie Collin of The Telegraph gave the film one out of five stars, and wrote "This is a film in which one of the more emotionally detailed performances is given by a product-placement Audi."

Jeannette Catsoulis, writing for The New York Times, found the film to be significantly inferior to Kim Basinger's 9½ Weeks, stating: "Layering a damp-squib thriller subplot beneath what appears to be an ad campaign for the one-percent lifestyle, the returning director and screenwriter test the newly married couple with an inconvenient pregnancy and an unconvincing car chase. There's an out-of-left-field abduction and a marital tiff over email addresses; but these narrative fragments, lazily tossed together alongside a neglected supporting cast, are no more than a flimsy causeway connecting bonking sessions."

Conversely, IndieWire reviewer Manuela Lazic gave the film three out of four stars, saying "Finally, the Fifty Shades'' phenomenon has yielded a disarming comedy that makes this ridiculous material fun to watch."

Accolades

References

External links
 
 
 

Fifty Shades
2018 films
2018 romantic drama films
2010s erotic drama films
2010s pregnancy films
Adultery in films
American erotic drama films
American erotic romance films
American romantic drama films
American pregnancy films
American sequel films
BDSM in films
Films based on British novels
Films based on romance novels
Films directed by James Foley
Films produced by Michael De Luca
Films scored by Danny Elfman
Films set in France
Films set in Seattle
Films shot in Paris
Films shot in Vancouver
Focus Features films
Works based on Twilight (novel series)
Golden Raspberry Award winning films
Perfect World Pictures films
Universal Pictures films
2010s English-language films
2010s American films